The Schwetzingen Festival (German: Schwetzinger Festspiele, now Schwetzinger SWR Festspiele) is an early summer festival of opera and other classical music presented each year from May to early June in Schwetzingen, Germany.

In 1952, the broadcaster Süddeutscher Rundfunk founded the festival in the Schwetzingen area. It is located in a beautiful 250-year-old palace and park, Schwetzingen Castle, near the famous city of Heidelberg. The main venue is the historic Schlosstheater Schwetzingen. Nowadays, the successor organization is the Südwestrundfunk (SWR) and it organises many international concerts and music theatre events every year.

List of major premieres and rediscoveries
One of the festival's characteristics is the world premiere of a new opera, as well as at least one rediscovered opera from former centuries, performed on period instruments.

Concerts
Concerts have featured well-known artists such as Gidon Kremer, Jorge Bolet and Cecilia Bartoli, as well as young artists at the start of their careers. Singers of the caliber of Barbara Hendricks, Fritz Wunderlich and Teresa Berganza have performed at the festival as beginners and have all gone on to major careers.

See also
List of opera festivals

References

External links
 Schwetzinger SWR Festspiele website

Music festivals in Germany
Opera festivals
Annual events in Germany
1952 establishments in West Germany
Music festivals established in 1952